Alan Gilmour is a Scottish-born playwright and librettist.

Alan or Allan Gilmour may also refer to:
Allan Gilmour Sr. (1775–1849), Scottish-born businessman in the shipping and timber industries
Allan Gilmour (1805–1884), Scottish-born businessman in the shipping and timber industries, nephew of the above
Alan Gilmour (footballer) (1911–1962), Australian rules footballer
Sir Allan Gilmour (British Army officer) (1916–2003), Scottish soldier and politician.
Allan Gilmour (university administrator), American President of Wayne State University

See also
Alan C. Gilmore (born 1944), New Zealand astronomer